Silent Nights is a rock album released in March 1985 by Rick Wakeman.

The single to the album entitled "Glory Boys" got a large amount of airplay but the pressing plant where it was being made went on strike. Although the shops were ordering the single in large amounts, not many copies of the single were available to be purchased. This meant that the airplay for the single stopped as people found it hard to purchase a copy.
Although the album was not a commercial success Rick Wakeman himself has stated on his official site that "Glory Boys" is probably the best single he has ever released.

Track listing
All titles composed and arranged by Rick Wakeman.

Side one

"Tell 'Em All You Know"  4.04
"The Opening Line"  3.47
"The Opera"  6.20
"Man's Best Friend"  4.27
"Glory Boys"  3.13

Side two

"Silent Nights"  3.54
"Ghost of a Rock 'n' Roll Star"  3.39
"The Dancer"  3.28
"Elgin Mansions"  5.13
"That's Who I Am"  4.15

Personnel

Rick Wakeman - keyboards, vocals, lead vocal (B3)
Tony Fernandez - drums, percussion
Chas Cronk - bass guitar
Rick Fenn - guitar
Bimbo Acock- saxophone (A3, B3)
Gordon Neville - lead vocals on all tracks (except A4, B3, B4)

References 

Rick Wakeman albums
1985 albums